The Szabella-Kupa (English: Szabella Cup) is a friendly handball event, which takes place at least once every year,  in parallel to the Kulcsár Anita Memorial Tournament. Sponsored by Sándor Szabella, it was created in 2007 and was organized until 2009 in August and in December. Since 2010, the Szabella Cup is held only in August.

Tournament structure
The first edition took place in August 2007, since then ten tournaments were organized. There is no precise format for this friendly tournament, usually four teams (two Hungarians and two other European teams) play the Szabella Cup. In early-August 2011, exceptionally six teams participated. It will also be the case in 2012 : because of the Summer Olympics, there will be only one tournament with six teams.

Summary

See also
 Kulcsár Anita-emléktorna

External links
 The tournament organizer, Sándor Szabella's, website 

Handball competitions in Europe
Women's handball competitions